Max banka a.s. is a Czech bank founded in 1991. It was formerly known as InterBank, InterBanka, BAWAG Bank CZ, LBBW Bank CZ and Expobank CZ. As of September 2022, Max banka is owned by Banka CREDITAS, which is part of the CREDITAS Group.

History

Interbank a Interbanka 
The original bank was established in 1991 as a Swiss-Hungarian joint venture under the name InterBank, akciová společnost (joint-stock company) and obtained a banking license on 28.12.1991; the current valid license (after the re-licensing) was received under the name Interbanka, akciová společnost (joint-stock company) on 13. 2. 2004 and was supplemented on 6.5.2005.

Between 1993 and 1997 a number of changes in the shareholder structure took place; this transition period stabilized at the end of 1997, when the German Bayerische Landesbank became the majority shareholder and the Hungarian Magyar Kulkereskedelmi Bank (MKB) and the Austrian Bank für Arbeit und Wirtschaft AG (BAWAG) became minority shareholders.

BAWAG Bank CZ 
In September 2003, BAWAG became the sole shareholder of Interbank a.s. and in June 2004 the bank was renamed BAWAG Bank CZ a.s. In September 2004, BAWAG acquired 100% of the shares of another bank on the Czech market - Dresdner Bank CZ a.s.

Dresdner Bank CZ a.s. was founded in 1991 as a joint venture of the French Banque National de Paris (BNP, later BNP Paribas) and the German Dresdner Bank AG, and under the original name BNP-Dresdner Bank (ČSFR) a.s. obtained a banking license on 3.9.1991. In 2001 Dresdner Bank AG became the sole shareholder of the bank, which was given a new license (re-licensed after the amendment to the Banking Act) under the name Dresdner Bank CZ a.s. on 4.11.2003. After BAWAG became the sole shareholder, Dresdner Bank CZ a.s. was renamed BAWAG International Bank CZ a.s. and ceased to exist on 31 March 2005 as a result of the merger with BAWAG Bank CZ a.s. as a successor bank.

LBBW Bank CZ 
In September 2008, another change occurred when German Landesbank Baden-Württemberg (LBBW) became the sole shareholder and BAWAG Bank CZ a.s. was renamed LBBW Bank CZ a.s. as part of the LBBW Group. The parent LBBW is both a commercial bank and a central bank of local savings banks in Baden-Württemberg, Saxony and Rhineland-Palatinate and is one of the largest banks in Germany.

Expobank CZ 
In January 2014, LBBW agreed to sell LBBW Bank CZ to the Russian bank Expobank owned by the entrepreneur Igor Kim. At the end of November 2014, the branch network has been reduced. Since the end of 2014, Igor Kim has been the majority owner of the Czech bank. On 15. 10. 2014 the business name of the bank was changed to Expobank CZ a.s.

In March 2016, Expobank CZ a.s. repurchased EAST Portfolio, s.r.o. in which it acquired a 100% stake from the German LBBW.

In March 2017 Expobank CZ a.s. was the first Czech bank to enter the Serbian market, where it became the sole shareholder of Marfin Bank a.d. Beograd. Marfin Bank subsequently changed its business name to Expobank Beograd.

In October 2018, Expobank announced the opening of its Cryptocurrency trading and investing services.

Since April 2019, Expobank CZ has been based in the Trimaran building, on Na strži street in Prague's Pankrác district. In August 2019, a branch that had been located on Wenceslas Square in Prague moved to the neighboring City Element building in Prague's Pankrác.

Max banka 
In September 2022, the bank was acquired by Banka CREDITAS and renamed Max banka with effect from 4 October. In October 2022, Max bank itself announced plans to become a purely retail online bank. In addition to the Max banka branch in Prague, its clients should gradually be able to use the branches of Banka CREDITAS for some services. The corporate clientele of Max banka should be completely transferred to Banka CREDITAS in the future.

Economic results

References

External links 

Banks of the Czech Republic
1991 establishments in Czechoslovakia
Companies based in Prague